Luis Torres Díaz (September 11, 1897 – 1988) was a Puerto Rican chemist, poet, and dean of the College of Pharmacy at the University of Puerto Rico. He is most widely known as the founder of the College’s Museum of Pharmacy, the first museum dedicated to the history of a health profession in Puerto Rico. Torres also authored several scientific works, including A Concise History of Pharmacy in Puerto Rico ("Breve historia de la farmacia en Puerto Rico"). Throughout his life, Torres wrote poetry for Puerto Rican newspapers and literary magazines, and in 1983 his collected works were published under the title Cántigas del Hondo Amor y Otros Poemas.

Early life and education 

Luis Torres Díaz was born to Vicente Cappa and Isabel Díaz Torres on September 11, 1897, in Peñuelas, Puerto Rico. He graduated from the Escuela Superior in Ponce before obtaining several degrees in chemistry and pharmacy from the University of Puerto Rico between 1919 and 1923. He earned a doctorate in Pharmacy from the Complutense University of Madrid where his thesis examined pharmaceutical practices in Puerto Rico. Torres also pursued additional graduate studies at the University of Michigan and Columbia University. From 1923 to 1925, he taught science and mathematics at Fajardo High School.

University of Puerto Rico 

Torres began a long and distinguished career at the University of Puerto Rico by joining the staff in 1925 as a chemistry and pharmacy instructor. He was appointed to an Assistant Professorship of Pharmacy in 1938, and by 1940 Torres had become a tenured professor of pharmacy and dean of the College of Pharmacy, positions he held for over forty years.

While dean, Torres served as chairman of the Puerto Rico Auxiliary Commission for the Revision of the United States Pharmacopeia, and as a committee member for the organization of the Pan-American Congress on Pharmaceutical Education held at Havana, Cuba, in December 1948.

Pharmacy museum 

Torres was an avid historian of pharmaceutical studies, and in 1947 he acquired a significant collection of original materials which helped create the Museum of Pharmacy at the University of Puerto Rico. In 1954, the Museum was established after Torres himself persuaded the university administrators to endow what became the first museum of any health profession on the island.

After the College of Pharmacy moved to the Medical Sciences Campus in 1984, the Museum reopened as the Luis Torres Díaz Pharmacy Museum, in honor of its founder. The museum continues to support research and education related to the evolution of pharmaceutical studies and practice in Puerto Rico. Although the museum expanded under a new name in 2007, nearly half of its collection still resides in the Luis Torres Diaz Hall on the first floor of the Pharmacy and Students Deanship building at the University of Puerto Rico Medical Sciences Campus in San Juan.

Scientific writings 

Throughout his career, Torres wrote a number of scientific books and articles, including: “Estudio Preliminar de una Dieta Usual en Puerto Rico” and A Concise History of Pharmacy in Puerto Rico ("Breve historia de la farmacia en Puerto Rico").

Poetry 

Torres also wrote poetry, and is considered a member of Puerto Rico’s modernist school. His poems appeared in El Mundo, Puerto Rico Ilustrado, Revista de las Antillas, Poliedro, y Gráfico de Puerto Rico. In 1983, a collection of his poetry was published under the title Cántigas del Hondo Amor y Otros Poemas.

List of poems:
 “El Paso de los Amantes”
 “Margarita”
 “Insomnio”
 “Mi Pegaso”
 “El Mendigo”
 “Ansias de Cumbres”
 “La Tarde del Bohío”

Personal life 
Torres married Emma Luis Vidal on July 12, 1923. They had three children: Luis Angel, Carlos Jose, and Emma Esther. They lived in Rio Piedras, Puerto Rico.

References 

1897 births
1988 deaths
20th-century American chemists
20th-century Puerto Rican educators
20th-century Puerto Rican poets
Puerto Rican poets
Puerto Rican scientists
University of Puerto Rico faculty
Museum founders
University of Puerto Rico alumni
Complutense University of Madrid alumni
People from Peñuelas, Puerto Rico
American university and college faculty deans
American pharmacologists
20th-century American academics